Austrobalanus is a genus of symmetrical sessile barnacles in the family Austrobalanidae, the sole genus of the family. There are at least three described species in Austrobalanus.

Species
These species belong to the genus Austrobalanus:
 Austrobalanus imperator (Darwin, 1854)
 Austrobalanus macdonaldensis Buckeridge, 1983
 † Austrobalanus antarcticus Buckeridge, 2000

References

Barnacles